Kirby Griffin (born June 16, 1983) is a former arena football player. He played on the defensive line for California University of Pennsylvania. He was signed as a free agent by the Jacksonville Sharks in 2009.

Griffin's older brother, Kris Griffin, is a former NFL linebacker.

External links
 Just Sports Stats
 Jacksonville Sharks Bio

1983 births
Living people
American football defensive linemen
American football linebackers
American football fullbacks
California Vulcans football players
Wilkes-Barre/Scranton Pioneers players
Jacksonville Sharks players
California University of Pennsylvania alumni
People from Rochester, Pennsylvania
Players of American football from Pennsylvania
Pittsburgh Power players